In the mathematical field of algebraic topology, the orientation sheaf on a manifold X of dimension n is a locally constant sheaf oX on X such that the stalk of oX at a point x is

(in the integer coefficients or some other coefficients).

Let  be the sheaf of differential k-forms on a manifold M. If n is the dimension of M, then the sheaf

is called the sheaf of (smooth) densities on M. The point of this is that, while one can integrate a differential form only if the manifold is oriented, one can always integrate a density, regardless of orientation or orientability; there is the integration map:

If M is oriented; i.e., the orientation sheaf of the tangent bundle of M is literally trivial, then the above reduces to the usual integration of a differential form.

See also 
Orientation of a manifold
There is also a definition in terms of dualizing complex in Verdier duality; in particular, one can define a relative orientation sheaf using a relative dualizing complex.

References

External links 
Two kinds of orientability/orientation for a differentiable manifold

Algebraic topology
Orientation (geometry)